Majura may refer to:

Australia
Majura (district) of the Australian Capital Territory
Mount Majura in the Australian Capital Territory

India
Majura, Gujarat